The chekker (or archiquier, eschequier, scaquer, scacarum, Schachtbret) is a European early musical instrument of the Middle Ages, first documented in 1360, whose exact details are a matter of academic debate. Some have suggested that the name is simply an alternate term for the clavichord, virginal, or similar early keyboard instrument, while others suggest that it refers to a distinctly different stringed keyboard instrument not otherwise well-attested.

References

Further reading
In Search of the Chekker: Progenitor of the String Keyboard Instrument. H.L. Aleyn Wykington, Apprentice to Master Stephen of Hunmanby OL. For Tir Righ Arts and Science Championship. October A.S. 46 

Harpsichord
Keyboard instruments
Early musical instruments
Lost and extinct musical instruments
1360 introductions
Plucked string instruments